Abu'l Faḍl is an Arabic male given name which also occurs in place-names. It means father of virtue. It is variously transliterated as Abu'l-Fadl, Abu'l-Fazl, Abul Fazal etc. It is also used in Iran and Azerbaijan, usually in the form of Abolfazl, or Abulfaz. Most famously, this is an epithet Abbas ibn Ali, who is highly revered in Islam for his loyalty towards his brother Husayn ibn Ali during the Battle of Karbala.

It may refer to:

People
Abu'l-Faḍl is the Kunya (Teknonym) for Muhammad's uncle and companion Al-ʻAbbas ibn ʻAbd al-Muṭṭalib
Abu'l-Faḍl, nickname given to ʻAbbas ibn ʻAli (647–680), the son of the first Shia Imam and the fourth Rashidun Caliph
Abu'l-Faḍl al-ʻAbbas ibn Fasanjas (c. 876-953), statesman who served the Buyid dynasty
Abu'l-Faḍl Jaʻfar ibn Aḥmad al-Muʻtaḍid, known as Al-Muqtadir (895–932), Abbasid Caliph in Baghdad
Abolfadl Harawi (10th century), Persian astronomer under the patronage of the Buyid dynasty 
Abu'l-Faḍl Bayhaqi (995–1077), Persian historian and author
Abu al-Faḍl ʻIyad ibn Amr ibn Musa ibn ʻIyad ..., known as Qadi Ayyad (1083–1149), imam in Ceuta, judge in Granada
Abu al-Faḍl Jaʻfar ibn ʻAli al-Dimashqi (12th-century), Muslim writer on commerce, from Damascus
Abu'l-Fazl ibn Mubarak (1551–1602), vizier of the Mughal emperor Akbar, and author of Akbarnama, the official history of Akbar's reign
Abul Fazl Mamuri (fl. c. 1700), historian of the Mughal Empire during Aurangzeb's reign
Mírzá Abu'l-Faḍl (1844–1914), Baháʼí scholar, who helped spread the Baháʼí Faith in Egypt, Turkmenistan, and the United States
Abul Fazal (writer) (1903–1983), Bangladeshi writer and educationist
Abul Fazal Mohammad Ahsanuddin Chowdhury, known as A. F. M. Ahsanuddin Chowdhury (1915–2001), President of Bangladesh
Abulfaz Elchibey (1938–2000), Azerbaijani political figure
Abū al-Faḍ, alternate name of Iyad Ag Ghaly (born c. 1954), Malian Tuareg militant
Abolfazl Jalili (born 1957), Iranian film director
Khaled Abou El Fadl (born 1963), Kuwaiti-American law professor
Abolfazl Attar (born 1968), Iranian film director, screenwriter & film editor
Abolfazl Hajizadeh (born 1981), Iranian footballer
Abolfazl Ebrahimi (born 1982), Iranian footballer
Abolfazl Fateh (born 1966), Iranian medical doctor, journalist and political activist
, Iranian Cleric
Seyed Abolfazl Mousavi Tabrizi, Iranian Cleric

Places
Abu al-Fadl, Ramle, Arab village, depopulated during the 1948 Arab-Israeli war
Chah Abu ol Fazl, village in Chahak Rural District, in the Central District of Khatam County, Yazd Province, Iran
Rustai-ye Abolfazl ebn Magh, village in Bajgan Rural District, Aseminun District, Manujan County, Kerman Province, Iran
Tolombeh-ye Garuh Keshavarzi Abu ol Fazl, village in Golzar Rural District, in the Central District of Bardsir County, Kerman Province, Iran

Arabic masculine given names